Acup was an unincorporated community in Kanawha County, West Virginia, United States. It was a camp of the Middle Fork Block Coal Company, which operated in the early 20th century.

References 

Unincorporated communities in Kanawha County, West Virginia
Coal towns in West Virginia